The 1968 Nobel Prize in Literature was awarded to the Japanese writer Yasunari Kawabata (1899–1972) "for his narrative mastery, which with great sensibility expresses the essence of the Japanese mind." He is the first Japanese recipient of the prize.

Laureate

Yasunari Kawabata's short story Izu no odoriko ("The Dancing Girl of Izu"), published in 1927, served as his literary debut. After producing a number of noteworthy works, Kawabata's 1937 novel Yukiguni ("Snow Country") established him as one of Japan's most renowned writers. In 1949, he published two serial novels Senbazuru ("Thousand Cranes") and Yama no Oto. His later works include Mizuumi ("The Lake", 1955) and Koto ("The Old Capital", 1962). Both in the author's home country and abroad, The Old Capital left the biggest impression.

Deliberations

Nominations
Kawabata was nominated on 8 occasions starting in 1961. He was annually nominated with single nominations made by members of the Swedish Academy. In 1968, his nomination was made by Eyvind Johnson, member of the said academy. 

In total, the Nobel Committee received 112 nominations for 76 individuals from various academics, literary critics and societies. Among the repeated nominees were Ezra Pound and E. M. Forster – both dismissed on account of their advancing ages – Max Frisch, Louis Aragon, Charles de Gaulle, Graham Greene, Vladimir Nabokov and Eugène Ionesco – the latter two authors were set aside because of their controversial works. Nineteen of the nominees were newly nominated such as Patrick White (awarded in 1973), Luis Buñuel, Claude Lévi-Strauss, Friedebert Tuglas, Tadeusz Różewicz, Vladimír Holan, Angus Wilson, Zbigniew Herbert, and Sławomir Mrożek. The oldest nominee was the Spanish philologist Ramón Menéndez Pidal (aged 99) and the youngest was Sławomir Mrożek (aged 38). Five of the nominees were women namely Marie Under, Anna Seghers, Marianne Moore, Mildred Breedlove, and Katherine Anne Porter.

The authors Karl Barth, Charles Bean, Joaquín Edwards Bello, Enid Mary Blyton, Max Brod, Abel Bonnard, Anthony Boucher, Helen Cam, León Felipe Camino, Jacques Chardonne, Donald Davidson, Pablo de Rokha, Margaret Duley, Edna Ferber, Romano Guardini,  Germaine Guèvremont, D. Gwenallt Jones, Fannie Hurst, Helen Keller, Alexandre Kojève, Zofia Kossak-Szczucka, Donagh MacDonagh, Dorothea Mackellar, Thomas Merton, Harold Nicolson, Mervyn Peake, Sixto Pondal Ríos, Conrad Richter, Marah Roesli, and Tian Han died in 1968 without having been nominated for the prize.

Prize decision
The leading contenders for the prize in 1968 were the French novelist André Malraux and the Irish playwright Samuel Beckett (awarded in 1969). The third proposal by the Nobel Committee was the British poet W. H. Auden and Kawabata was the fourth. Anders Österling, chair of the committee, and committee member Eyvind Johnson pushed for the choice of Malraux, while the other three members of the committee supported a prize for Beckett. Eventually Kawabata was the candidate that could be agreed upon, following the Swedish Academy's ambition in the 1960's to award authors from different language areas and parts of the world. While supporting a prize for Malraux, Österling admitted that a prize for Kawabata "should prove justified and welcome."

Nobel lecture
Kawabata's Nobel Lecture was titled Japan, The Beautiful and Myself. Zen Buddhism was a key focal point of the speech; much was devoted to practitioners and the general practices of Zen Buddhism and how it differed from other types of Buddhism. He presented a severe picture of Zen Buddhism, where disciples can enter salvation only through their efforts, where they are isolated for several hours at a time, and how from this isolation there can come beauty. He noted that Zen practices focus on simplicity and it is this simplicity that proves to be the beauty. "The heart of the ink painting is in space, abbreviation, what is left undrawn." From painting he moved on to talk about ikebana and bonsai as art forms that emphasize the elegance and beauty that arises from the simplicity. "The Japanese garden, too, of course symbolizes the vastness of nature."

In addition to the numerous mentions of Zen and nature, one topic that was briefly mentioned in Kawabata's lecture was that of suicide. Kawabata reminisced of other famous Japanese authors who committed suicide, in particular Ryūnosuke Akutagawa. He contradicted the custom of suicide as being a form of enlightenment, mentioning the priest Ikkyū, who also thought of suicide twice. He quoted Ikkyū, "Among those who give thoughts to things, is there one who does not think of suicide?" There was much speculation about this quote being a clue to Kawabata's suicide in 1972, a year and a half after Mishima had committed suicide.

Notes

References

External links
Ceremony speech by Anders Österling nobelprize.org

1968
Yasunari Kawabata